"Play My Song" is a single by American–Hungarian artist Kállay Saunders featuring Swedish rapper Rebstar. It was released on August 21, 2013, with a music video on October 7, 2013

Chart performance
Play My Song peaked the MAHASZ Top 40 Radio Charts at 16.

Weekly charts

Track listings
 Digital download
 "Play My Song" – 4:38

Credits and personnel
 Vocals – Kállay Saunders,
 Producer – Krisztián Szakos, Balazs Megyeri
 Lyrics – Kállay Saunders, Rebin Shah
 Label: Today Is Vintage

Release history

References

2012 songs
2013 singles